Friction sensitivity is an approximation of the amount of friction or rubbing a compound can withstand before prematurely exploding. For instance, nitroglycerin has an extremely high sensitivity to friction, meaning that very little rubbing against it could set off a violent explosion. There is no exact determining the amount of friction required to set off a compound, but is rather approximated by the amount of force applied and the amount of time before the compound explodes.

Explosives engineering